Galeh Bardar is a village in Sadat Rural District, in the Central District of Lali County, Khuzestan Province, Iran. At the 2006 census, its population was 45, in 9 families.

References 

Populated places in Lali County